Scattershot may refer to:

Scattershot (book), a 2008 memoir by David Lovelace
Scattershot (Transformers), a Transformers character